Margarites ecarinatus is a species of sea snail, a marine gastropod mollusk in the family Margaritidae.

Description
The height of the shell attains 8 mm. The pinkish grey shell is depressed. It has about five rapidly enlarging whorls. The glassy nucleus is minute. The subsequent whorls are moderately inflated. They are separated by a deep but not channelled suture, having a rounded periphery, a wide, completely pervious umbilicus, and a large, very oblique, iridescent aperture. The axial sculpture consists of very fine silky incremental lines. The spiral sculpture consists of low flattish threads separated by narrower interspaces sometimes carrying a finer intercalary thread. This sculpture is carried over the base but is absent from the walls of the wide umbilicus;. The rounded aperture is very oblique. Its margins are sharp, hardly meeting over the body except by a thin layer of enamel. The brown  operculum is thin, and multispiral.

References

External links
 To Biodiversity Heritage Library (1 publication)
 To Encyclopedia of Life
 To ITIS
 To World Register of Marine Species

ecarinatus
Gastropods described in 1919